Cao Cuifen (born 6 April 1944) is a Chinese actress. She is best known for her performance in the film Raise the Red Lantern.

Early life
Cao Cuifen was born in Shanghai, China on April 6, 1944. She was admitted to the Beijing Film Academy prep school in 1960 and the undergraduate program in 1962. She left the academy due to the Cultural Revolution and did not return until 1973.

Career
Cao started in her first film, Civil War, when she was 29. In order to support her film career, she decided against having children. She starred in Raise the Red Lantern and Shanghai Family in 1991, working on the films back to back. In 1995, she starred in the film, Orphan Tears, which she won several awards for her performance.

Filmography

Film

Television

References

External links
 
Cao Cuifen at the Hong Kong Movie Database

1944 births
Living people
Actresses from Shanghai
Beijing Film Academy alumni
20th-century Chinese actresses
21st-century Chinese actresses